Onimim Ernestina Jacks (née Briggs) is a lawyer serving since June 2015 as the Rivers State Commissioner of Agriculture in Nigeria. She is a member of the Rivers State People's Democratic Party.

Early life and education
Jacks was born on 4 December 1961 in Buguma, Asari-Toru local government area of Rivers State. She attended Federal Government College, Port Harcourt for her secondary school education and studied law at the University of Lagos receiving her Bachelor of Laws degree in 1983. She also obtained a Masters in Law (LL.M) in 1991 and was called to the Nigerian Bar in 1984 enrolling as a Barrister and Solicitor of the Supreme Court of Nigeria. In 1987, she became an Attorney and Counselor of the Law of the state of New York.

Career and politics 
Jacks had a short Legal Practice in the United States of America between 1986 and 1987 as a Volunteer Attorney in the Civil Division of the New York City Legal Aid Society in Chelsea, New York.

In 1989 she returned to Nigeria and set up a private Legal Practice in Lagos and Port Harcourt under the name Onimim Briggs & Co. with specialized practice in the sectors of Banking and Oil & Gas.

From 1998 to 2008, she was a lecturer at the Nigerian Law School Abuja. After which she became the Executive Director of the Legal Research Institute, Abuja. In 2001, She served as Chief Legislative officer in the office of Senator Ibiapuye Martins-Yellowe.

In 2009, she was appointed by Governor Nysesom Wike as Sole Administrator of the Rivers State Library Board and subsequently the Rivers State Commissioner of Agriculture in June 2015.

Honors and awards
Member, Governing Council of the Federal Government College, Port Harcourt
Fellow, FIDA
Fellow, Ashoka

Publications
Works published by Jacks include;

Using ADR in resolving maritime disputes: a Nigerian perspective, Volume 1, Number 1, Port Harcourt Bar Journal, December 2004
Women’s Rights under the Nigerian Criminal Law, a monograph. 2003
Genderizing the 1999 Constitution, accepted for publication, Journal of Public Law, RSUST Vol. 2 2003
Case Review; State vs. Cornelius Obasi (1998) 9 NWLR, (part 567) 686, the Nigerian Law and Practice Journal of the Council of Legal Education, 
The Problems of the Niger Delta as a Human Rights Issue, a paper presented at the conference on the Niger Delta at Port Harcourt, 6–9 December 2000.
The Legal Regime of the Local Government System in Nigeria, University of Calabar Law Journal, 2001.

See also
List of people from Rivers State
Rivers State Ministry of Agriculture
Customary Court of Appeal

References

External links
Profile at Ashoka

Living people
Rivers State Commissioners of Agriculture
Rivers State lawyers
Rivers State Peoples Democratic Party politicians
First Wike Executive Council
People from Buguma
Nigerian women lawyers
21st-century Nigerian women politicians
21st-century Nigerian politicians
Women government ministers of Nigeria
1961 births